Calpurnus verrucosus, the Umbilical Egg Shell or Warty/Little Egg Cowry, is a species of sea snail, a cowry, a marine gastropod mollusk in the family Ovulidae, the cowries.

Distribution
This species is mainly distributed in the tropical South East Africa and in the Western Pacific Ocean, in the waters along Madagascar, Mascarene Islands, Red Sea, Indonesia, Thailand and Philippines.

Description 

The shells of this species reach  of length. This cowry is pure white, smooth and ovate, the base is flat and wide. The anterior and posterior extremities have a slight purple coloration, with a yellow circle at the edge of a depressed pustule (hence the Latin name of this species, verrucosus ). The mantle of the living cowries is white and completely covered by small brown spots. Also the foot is white with dark dots and can be extended widely around the base of the shell.

Habitat 
Living cowries can mainly be encountered in daylight under soft corals, sponges and rocks in shallow to deep waters at a depth of 20–50 m. They primarily feed on the polyps of Leather Corals (Sacrophyton and Lobophytum species, Alcyoniidae). At night they spread their mantles on the top of the soft coral and start grazing on the polyps.

References

 Lorenz F. & Fehse D. (2009). The Living Ovulidae - A manual of the families of Allied Cowries: Ovulidae, Pediculariidae and Eocypraeidae. Conchbooks, Hackenheim, Germany
 Cate, C. N. 1973 - A systematic revision of the recent Cypraeid family Ovulidae - Veliger 15: 1-117

External links

Biolib
C. verrucosus
Marine species
Calpurnus species
 

Ovulidae
Gastropods described in 1758
Taxa named by Carl Linnaeus